The 1994–95 B Group was the 39th season of the Bulgarian B Football Group, the second tier of the Bulgarian football league system.

A total of 32 teams contested the league: 16 in the North B Group and 16 in the South B Group. LEX Lovech finished top of the North Group and Neftochimic Burgas finished top of the South Group.

North B Group

South B Group

References

1993-94
Bul
2